Mark Villon (born 6 July 1983) is a Filipino international footballer who plays as a defender for Manila Jeepney F.C. Villon previously played for San Beda College and made his international debut in 2002.

External links

1983 births
Living people
People from Zamboanga City
Filipino footballers
Philippines international footballers
San Beda University alumni
Association football defenders